Schistura tenura is a species of ray-finned fish, a stone loach, in the genus Schistura. This species has only ever been recorded from the  Nam Leuk catchment in Laos. It was recorded in a small stream with a bed of rock and stone, it has not been recorded since 1998 but there have been no searches for it.

References

T
Fish described in 2000